Saleemullah Khan (1921 – 15 January 2017) was a Pakistani Islamic scholar and former President of Wifaq ul Madaris Al-Arabia, Pakistan. His students include Muhammad Rafi Usmani and Muhammad Taqi Usmani.
Khan established Jamia Farooqia in Karachi in 1967.

Education and career
Saleemullah Khan was born in Muzaffarnagar, India. 
Starting in 1942, he studied at Darul Uloom Deoband, India. He studied there under the guidance of Hussain Ahmad Madni, Izaz Ali Amrohi and many other teachers. He completed his traditional dars-e-nizami degree in 1947. Then he taught at a seminary in India for eight years before he decided to migrate to Pakistan. In Pakistan, he founded Jamiah Farooqia, Karachi in 1967.

Khan taught at Tando Allahyar, Sindh, Pakistan for three years and also at Dar-ul-Uloom, Karachi later.

He also served as president of Wafaq ul Madaris Al-Arabia, Pakistan (Federation of Islamic Seminaries, Pakistan) from 8 June 1989 to 15 January 2017, for over 27 years.

Literary works
In a fatwa, Darul Uloom Deoband has regarded Khan's 16 volume commentary to Sahih al-Bukhari entitled Kashaful Baari as one of the best commentaries.

Death and legacy
Khan died on Sunday, 15 January 2017 in Karachi. His funeral prayer was performed twice and attended by Muhammad Taqi Usmani, Tariq Jamil, Muhammad Ahmed Ludhianvi. His son, Muhammad Adil Khan was assassinated on 10 October 2020.

References

Citations

Bibliography
 
	ہدایۃ القاری ازمفتی فریدؒ اور کشف الباری از مولانا سلیم اللہ خانؒ کا تقابلی مطالعہ

1921 births
2017 deaths
Pakistani Islamic religious leaders
Pakistani Sunni Muslim scholars of Islam
Central Model School, Lahore alumni
Muslim missionaries
Darul Uloom Deoband alumni
People from Muzaffarnagar district
Presidents of Wifaq ul Madaris Al-Arabia
Pakistani religious writers
Deobandis
Wifaq ul Madaris Al-Arabia people
General Secretaries of Wifaq ul Madaris Al-Arabia